Fotbal Club Unirea Dej, commonly known as Unirea Dej, is a Romanian professional football club from Dej, Cluj County, Romania, founded in 1921. They play in the Liga II.

History

It is one of Romania's oldest football teams, although it never reached the Liga I.

Unirea's home field, Stadionul Unirea, has 5,000 seats. In 2004 Unirea Dej became the reserve team of CFR Cluj, until the summer of 2007. It has an average audience of about 300 fans.

Since September 2008 the club has collaborated with AC Milan. The Italian club wishes to build a sports base for young players. "We will be an associated club with AC Milan, and Unirea shorts will have Milan's crest," said a staff member. Eusebiu Şuvagău has been the head coach until summer 2010. He was replaced by Constantin Olariu who left the team in October 2010 being replaced by Ioan Tătăran. When Tătăran became technical director of FC Maramureş Universitar Baia Mare in July 2011, Şuvagău returned as head coach.

In the 2020–21 season, Unirea Dej finished the 9th series of 3rd league in 2nd place and reached the promotion play-off. Unirea defeated Minaur Baia Mare (0–0 at Baia Mare and 3–1 at Dej) and SCM Zalău (0–0 in at home, 1–1 at Zalău) and after 14 years of absence, exactly when the club celebrated 100 years since it was founded, it promoted back to the Liga II.

The team coached by Dragoș Militaru finished 9th in the 2021–22 regular season of Liga II. In the play-out, the blue-and-whites achieved five victories and suffered only one defeat, ranking in second place.

Honours
Liga III
Winners (3): 1965–66, 1993–94, 2003–04
Runners-up (7): 1970–71, 1973–74, 1974–75, 1975–76, 1980–81, 1991–92, 2020–21
Liga IV – Cluj County
Winners (2): 1982–83, 1988–89

Players

First-team squad

Out on loan
}

Club Officials

Board of directors

Current technical staff

League history

References

External links

 
Dej
Sport in Cluj County
Football clubs in Cluj County
Association football clubs established in 1921
Liga II clubs
Liga III clubs
1921 establishments in Romania